The NBA lockout may refer to any of the four lockouts in the history of the National Basketball Association:
The 1995 NBA lockout, which lasted for three months before the 1995–96 season.
The 1996 NBA lockout, which lasted for a couple of hours before the 1996–97 season.
The 1998–99 NBA lockout, which lasted for more than six months and forced the 1998–99 season to be shortened to 50 regular season games per team and that season's All-Star Game to be canceled.
The 2011 NBA lockout, which lasted for five months and forced the 2011–12 season to be shortened to 66 regular season games per team.

See also
MLB lockout
MLS lockout
NFL lockout
NHL lockout

References

lockout
Lockout
Sports labor disputes in the United States